The 2000 Six Nations Championship was the first series of the rugby union Six Nations Championship, following the addition of Italy to the Five Nations. It was the 106th season of the championship overall.

The title was won by England. England won their first four games and met winless Scotland in their final match. Scotland earned a surprising victory and denied England the Grand Slam. 

Italy won their first game in the championship with a surprising 34–20 win over Scotland, who had won the previous year's Five Nations. Italy did not win any of their other games and finished in sixth place.

Participants
The teams involved were:

Squads

Table

Results

Round 1

Round 2

Round 3

Round 4

Round 5

References

External links
2000 Six Nations Championship at ESPN
2000 Six Nations Championship Coverage at RTÉ (Archived)

 
2000 rugby union tournaments for national teams
2000
1999–2000 in European rugby union
1999–2000 in Irish rugby union
1999–2000 in English rugby union
1999–2000 in Welsh rugby union
1999–2000 in Scottish rugby union
1999–2000 in French rugby union
1999–2000 in Italian rugby union
February 2000 sports events in Europe
March 2000 sports events in Europe
April 2000 sports events in Europe